Andar may refer to:
Andar District, Ghazni province, Afghanistan
Andar, Ghazni, town in the Andar District of Ghazni Province, Afghanistan
Andar, Fars, Iran
Andar, Kurdistan, Iran
Andar, Tehran, Iran
Andar (Pashtun tribe), a Pashtun sub-tribe
, sword of Indonesia
Andar, Siwan, a community development block in India

See also
Andor (disambiguation)